Aura Star: Attack of the Temple, also known as Aola Star, is a 2015 3D Chinese animated children's fantasy adventure film directed by Frankie Chung. It was released on July 23, 2015. It is based on the online web browser game Aola Star.

Plot

Voice cast
Anqi Zhang
Qi Zhang
Zhengxiang Li
Shuai Zhou
Beichen Liu
Feng Jin
Lu Zhao
Jia Zhan
Xianglong Meng

Reception
The film earned  at the Chinese box office.

References

External links

2010s fantasy adventure films
2015 3D films
2015 animated films
2015 films
Animated adventure films
Chinese 3D films
Chinese animated fantasy films
Chinese children's films
Animated films based on video games
Films based on Internet-based works
3D animated films